Golden Eagle Award for Best Actor (Chinese name:中国电视金鹰奖最佳男主角,1983–1999;中国电视金鹰奖观众喜爱的男演员,2003-2018, 最佳男演员, 2020-now) is a main category of the China TV Golden Eagle Award. From 2003 to 2014, the title of Best Actor (视帝) was given to the winner who won both the Golden Eagle Award's Audience's Choice and the festival's Performing Arts awards. The top honour is voted in by a panel of judges, the China Television Artists Association and the national audience. This category was absent during 2000-2002. Since 2020, the award has been split from Audience's Choice for Actor, and is voted in by a panel of judges and the CTAA.

Winners and nominees

2020s

2010s

2000s

1990s

1980s

References

External links
Past Winners of Golden Eagles

Television awards for Best Actor
Actor